Kanmani Poonga is a 1982 Indian Tamil-language film written and directed by Visu. The film stars himself, Saritha and Kishmu. It was released on 14 November 1982 and failed commercially.

Plot 
The film deals with two men played by Visu and Kishmu married to twins played by Saritha. While Visu is impotent, though he is unaware, due to him having addiction problems and injury as a cricketer, Kishmu cannot have enough children, having one every year. Visu's wife and Kishmu's wife along with Kishmu do everything in their power to hide his impotency from him with the climax being Visu's wife removing her uterus to save his name and image as a celebrity while Kishmu too realizes that having so many children is not good and ends up having a vasectomy.

Cast 
 Visu
 Saritha
 Kishmu
 M. R. Rajamani
 Kuriyakos Ranga

Production 
Kanmani Poonga was the second directorial venture of Visu, who also wrote it. The film was produced by V. Mohan of Anandhi Films, photographed by N. Balakrishnan and edited by N. R. Kittu.

Soundtrack 
The soundtrack was composed by M. S. Viswanathan.

Release 

Kanmani Poonga was released on 14 November 1982, and failed commercially. The film received an A certificate from the Censor Board, and Visu avoided directing such films in the future, instead going for family entertainment.

References

External links 
 

1980s Tamil-language films
1982 films
Films directed by Visu
Films scored by M. S. Viswanathan
Films with screenplays by Visu